Qadir Bakhsh (born 1945), is a Pakistani former professional footballer, who was known as Putla during his heyday in the 1960s and 1970s.

He has been partially paralyzed since 2003 and been receiving treatment at the Lyari General Hospital. A recent stroke had left him unable to use his right leg and hand and he needs to undergo regular physiotherapy.

Club career
Qadir was a fantastic midfielder in his hey days and he has honour of leading the national side on several occasions. He also led Sindh Red that clinched 1975 National Championship at Quetta. He also played pro-football for WPIDC, Mohammedan Sporting Club (MSC), Dilkusha SC, and Victoria SC.

National career
He was a member of Pakistan national football team for 10 years, 1965 to 1975. He took part in tournaments: RCD Cup 1965, RCD Cup 1967, RCD Cup 1969 and was captain in RCD Cup 1970.

Managerial career
He was coach of President's Eleven that finished above national team in 1986 President's Gold Cup held under Pakistan Customs.

References

1945 births
Pakistani footballers
Pakistan international footballers
Living people
Mohammedan SC (Dhaka) players
People from Lyari Town
Association football midfielders